Thiti Mahayotaruk or Bank (แบงค์) is an actor in Thailand, known for his role as Non in Hormones: The Series.

Career
Thiti Mahayotaruk was born on 19 November 1996 in Khon Kaen, Thailand. He joined a Hormones: The Next Gen audition and placed in the top 12. Later he was placed in the top 5, and made his debut in season 2 of Hormones: The Series. After that he received an offer to play a role in ThirTEEN Terrors. He appeared in episode 4, titled "Missed Call".

In 2015 he was cast for a four-episode LINE short drama series titled Stay The Series. Later he reprised his role as Non in the last season of Hormones: The Series. He also took part in the movie May Who?, where he was paired with Sutatta Udomsilp.

In 2016, he played for another series titled Diary of Tootsies. He also participated in the Love Songs Love Series project.

Filmography

Films

Television series

Music video appearance
 2014 Ahp Num Raun (อาบน้ำร้อน) Ost.Hormones: The Series 3 - Big Ass (Genierock/YouTube:Genierock)
 2014 Nung Sue Roon (หนังสือรุ่น) Ost.ThirTEEN Terrors - Cocktail (Genierock/YouTube:Genierock)
 2015  (ย้อน) Ost.Hormones 3 The Final Season - Slot Machine (/YouTube:GTHchannel)
 2016  (เพราะ (Just Because)) - Marie Eugenie Le Lay (The Zommarie/YouTube:zommarie)
 2019  (MCT Compshare : รักติดไซเรน) Ost.My Ambulance - Paris Intarakomalyasut, Nichaphat Chatchaipholrat (Nadao Bangkok/YouTube:Nadao Music)
 2020  (เจอกันก็พัง ห่างกันก็ร้าย) - Nichaphat Chatchaipholrat (Nadao Bangkok/YouTube:Nadao Music)
 2021 Sa Tha Na Nhai Nai Sai Ta (สถานะไหนในสายตา) Ost.Jit Sang Harn - Yes'sir Days (Genierock/YouTube:Genierock)
 2022 Jao Ying (เจ้าหญิง) Ost.My Sassy Princess 2022 - Marie Eugenie Le Lay (One Music (ชื่อเดิม : Exact Music)/YouTube:ช่อง one31) with Earnearn Fatima Dechawaleekul

Awards and nominations

References

External links
 
 

1996 births
Living people
Thiti Mahayotaruk
Thiti Mahayotaruk